Cecilia Christine Elisabeth Andersson (born October 4, 1982) is a Swedish retired ice hockey goaltender. She represented  in the women's ice hockey tournament at the 2006 Winter Olympics and in the 2005 IIHF Women's World Championship.

References

External links

1982 births
Living people
Concordia Stingers women's ice hockey players
Swedish expatriate ice hockey players in Canada
Ice hockey players at the 2006 Winter Olympics
Les Canadiennes de Montreal players
Medalists at the 2006 Winter Olympics
Olympic ice hockey players of Sweden
Olympic medalists in ice hockey
Olympic silver medalists for Sweden
Ice hockey people from Stockholm
Swedish women's ice hockey goaltenders